Seacon may refer to:

The 19th World Science Fiction Convention, Seacon, held in Seattle, Washington, in 1961
The 37th World Science Fiction Convention, Seacon '79, held in Brighton, England, in 1979
 Seacon Square Srinakarin, a mall located in eastern Bangkok, Thailand
 Seacon Square Bangkae, a mall located in Thonburi Bangkok, Thailand